Rize is a coastal city in the eastern part of the Black Sea Region of Turkey. It is the seat of Rize Province and Rize District. Its population is 119,828 (2021). Rize is a typically Turkish provincial capital with little in the way of nightlife or entertainment. However the border with Georgia has been open since the early 1990s, the Black Sea coast road has been widened and the town is much wealthier than it used to be. Current Turkish President Recep Tayyıp Erdoğan's family has its roots in Rize and the local university is named after him. The city is linked by road with Trabzon (41 miles [66 km] west), Hopa (55 miles [88 km] east on the Georgian border, and Erzurum (south). Rize–Artvin Airport started operating in 2022.

Name
The name comes from Greek  (riza) or Ριζαίον (Rizaion), meaning "mountain slopes" ( in Greek means root). In modern times, its Greek name was usually Ριζούντα (Rizunda). Its Latin forms are Rhizus and Rhizaeum, the latter of which is used in the Catholic Church's list of titular sees as the name of bishopric of the town, which was once part of the late Roman province of Pontus Polemoniacus<ref>Annuario Pontificio 2013 (Libreria Editrice Vaticana, 2013), p. 959</ref>). 

History

Arrian was the first writer to mention Rize. In his Periplus of the Euxine Sea, he described it as a city founded at the mouth of the river of the same name, the ancient and Byzantine ῾Ρίζιος ποταμός.Dated to 130–131AD and written as a letter to Roman Emperor Hadrian, the work records how its author, the governor of Cappadocia, made a tour of the Eastern Black Sea territories that formed part of his jurisdiction, first visiting the Roman Empire's Eastern Anatolian frontier garrisons before pushing on to the Black Sea coast in the Trabzon (Trebizond) region.
The city of Rize formed part of the historic Georgian province of Chaneti.  

From 1547, Chaneti province was incorporated into the Ottoman Empire and became a part of the sancak of Lazistan. The city was claimed by the short-lived Democratic Republic of Georgia between 1918 and 1920. On the basis of the 1921 Treaty of Kars, Soviet Russia granted Rize to Turkey along with the other territories of Artvin, Ardahan, and Hopa.

Geography
The city is built around a small bay on the Black Sea coast, on a narrow strip of flat land between the sea and the mountains behind. The coastal strip is being expanded with landfill and the city is expanding up the steep hillsides away from the coast. 

Rize is probably best known for its black tea which was introduced to the region in the 1940s and 1950s, changing the destiny of a region which was until then desperately poor.  The local tea research institute was founded in 1958 and other tea gardens can be seen all around the town. Tea is even planted in local gardens. Rize is a centre for processing and shipping  locally grown Rize Tea. More recently kiwifruit plants have also been grown in Rize. Fishing remains another important local source of income.

Tourism to destinations in and around Rize is growing in importance.

Climate
Rize has a humid subtropical climate (Köppen: Cfa, Trewartha: Cf). and is vulnerable to storms coming off the Black Sea. However, as any mountainous region of Turkey, it is rich in climatic variety. The climate turns oceanic (Cfb) on the hillsides, continental (Dfb/Dc) and subarctic (Dfc/Eo'') on the mountain slopes and in the yaylas, the highlands and highland plateaus. When the Köppen climate classification was being created, the city centre had a borderline oceanic-humid subtropical climate, falling just under the  threshold for the hottest month of the year, yet climate change and global warming have contributed to its being classified as humid subtropical in recent decades.

The city's climate is defined by mild temperate conditions, with warm summers, cool winters and heavy rainfall year-round with a maximum in late autumn (October to December). The city has relatively few sunshine hours, lower than many stereotypically cloudy locations in Western Europe. Snowfall is occasional, but can be very heavy once it starts. The water temperature, typical for the Black Sea coast, is never too warm or cold, fluctuating between  throughout the year.

Economy and produce
Historically, Rize grew oranges. However, weather destroyed the crops in the early 20th century, and the industry declined. The area also produced small amounts of manganese.

Rize's economic structure is primarily based on its geographic location since it is in a very mountainous location, making industrial development impractical. Given the lack of rail transit, most goods have to travel by truck or ship, which makes exporting and importing difficult. Rize's primary trading partner is Trabzon, the most developed city of the northeast Black Sea region. Rize's main exports are agriculturally based; tea and kiwifruit are among its most popular commodities.

Education
Rize University was founded in 2006. Its name was changed to Recep Tayyip Erdoğan University in 2011.

Culture
Rize Castle is a partly ruined medieval castle to the southwest of the city centre.

Sports
Rize's sports venues include Rize Atatürk Stadium, Yeni Rize Şehir Stadı and Rize Sports Complex consisting of Rize Sports Hall and Rize Indoor Swimming Pool.

The football team of Çaykur Rizespor play in the TFF First League. Pazarspor football team compete in the TFF Third League.

Notable people
 Murat Karayalçın
 Mehmet Haberal
 Mesut Yılmaz
 Birol Topaloğlu
 Deniz Gezmiş
 Recep Tayyip Erdoğan (1954–), Turkish politician, Prime Minister of Turkey (2003–2014), and President of Turkey (2014–present)
 Sergen Yalçın, Turkish football player and manager
 Hakan Yılmaz
 Abdullah Avcı
 Fahri Tatan
 Murat Hacıoğlu
 Mustafa Topaloğlu
 Gökhan Birben
 İsmail Türüt
 Köksal Toptan
 Mehmet Bekaroğlu
 Besim Tibuk
 Asena
 Yılmaz Morgül
 İlyas Tüfekçi

Population

Notes

References 
 [Encyclopedic Dictionary of Black Sea]. 2 Cilt. Heyamola Yayıncılık. Istanbul.

External links

 

 
Populated places in Rize District
Roman towns and cities in Turkey
Black Sea port cities and towns in Turkey
Fishing communities in Turkey
Populated coastal places in Turkey